Bongir (also Romanized as Bongīr; also known as Bongarī and Bon Gīrī) is a village in Bahmayi-ye Sarhadi-ye Sharqi Rural District, Dishmok District, Kohgiluyeh County, Kohgiluyeh and Boyer-Ahmad Province, Iran. At the 2006 census, its population was 134, in 25 families.

References 

Populated places in Kohgiluyeh County